Shinbo (written: 新房) is a Japanese surname. Notable people with the surname include:

Akiyuki Shinbo (新房 昭之) (born 1961), Japanese animation director

See also
Shinbo Nomura (のむら しんぼ) (born 1955), Japanese manga artist

Japanese-language surnames